A cricket team representing the Gloucestershire Cricket Board played seven List A cricket matches between 1999 and 2002. This is a list of the players who appeared in those matches.

Stuart Barnes, 5 matches, 2000–2001
Alastair Bressington, 3 matches, 1999–2000
Nathan Bressington, 2 matches, 2000 
Christopher Budd, 5 matches, 1999–2001
Stephen Caple, 1 match, 2002 
Danny Chard, 1 match, 2001 
Mark Coombes, 2 matches, 1999–2002
Tom Cotterell, 1 match, 2000 
Simon Cowley, 1 match, 2000 
Andrew Edwards, 3 matches, 1999–2000
Damian Forder, 3 matches, 1999–2001
Alex Gidman, 3 matches, 2001 
Will Gidman, 1 match, 2002 
Mark Guest, 1 match, 2002 
Simon Hinks, 1 match, 1999 
Richard Howell, 3 matches, 2000–2001
Robert Jennings, 1 match, 2001 
Paul Lazenbury, 1 match, 1999 
Imraan Mohammad, 2 matches, 2000 
James Pearson, 2 matches, 2001 
Stephen Pope, 5 matches, 1999–2001
Stuart Priscott, 1 match, 2001 
James Rendell, 4 matches, 1999–2002
William Rudge, 2 matches, 2001–2002
Ben Staunton, 4 matches, 2001–2002
Neil Stovold, 3 matches, 2001–2002
Nicholas Stovold, 5 matches, 2000–2001
Michael Sutliff, 1 match, 2001 
Chris Taylor, 1 match, 1999 
Jackson Thompson, 1 match, 2002 
Jonathan White, 7 matches, 1999–2002
Graham Williams, 1 match, 2002

References

Gloucestershire Cricket Board